Sunday Island is located in the Indian Ocean 530 ft (161.5 m) southeast of Dirk Hartog Island and 23 miles (37 km) southwest of Denham in Western Australia at -26.124295 south latitude and 113.236538 east longitude.  It measures approximately 263 ft (80.2 m) by 108 ft (33 m). In the 19th century, it was a source of guano for British traders. It is now part of the Shark Bay World Heritage Site.

References

Islands of Shark Bay